Bidal Bacheh (also Romanized as Bīdal Bacheh) is a village in Mishan Rural District, Mahvarmilani District, Mamasani County, Fars Province, Iran. At the 2006 census, its population was 21, in 5 families.

References 

Populated places in Mamasani County